Serenity is a double album by Swedish pianist Bobo Stenson recorded in 1999 and released on the ECM label.

Reception 
The Penguin Guide to Jazz selected this album as part of its suggested “Core Collection”, describing it as “a towering achievement.”
The Allmusic review by Thom Jurek awarded the album 4½ stars stating "Simply put, there are no records like the Stenson Trio's Serenity. The band has outdone themselves by their slow, careful development over three records and has become one of the premier rhythm trios on the planet. Serenity is not only the group's coup de grace, but also a jazz masterpiece of the highest order".  The JazzTimes review by Stuart Nicholson stated "Here, Stenson emerges as an original voice within jazz, which in these renascent times is cause enough for celebration".

Track listing
All compositions by Bobo Stenson except as indicated

Disc One:
 "T." (Anders Jormin) - 6:46
 "West Print" - 2:24
 "North Print" (Jormin) - 2:04
 "East Print" (Jon Christensen) - 2:42
 "South Print" - 2:32
 "Polska of Despair (II)" (Lorens Brolin) - 4:41
 "Golden Rain" - 5:16
 "Swee Pea" (Wayne Shorter) - 6:55
 "Simple & Sweet" (Jormin) - 8:17
 "Der Pflaumenbaum" (Hanns Eisler) - 4:31

Disc Two:
 "El Mayor" (Silvio Rodríguez) - 5:29
 "Fader V (Father World)" - 7:23
 "More Cymbals" (Christensen, Jormin, Stenson) - 4:18
 "Extra Low" (Christensen, Jormin, Stenson) - 0:41
 "Die Nachtigall" (Alban Berg) - 4:51
 "Rimbaud Gedicht" (Eisler) - 3:15
 "Polska of Despair (I)" (Brolin) - 6:55
 "Serenity" (Charles Ives) - 5:20
 "Tonus" - 6:13

Personnel
Bobo Stenson — piano
Anders Jormin — bass
Jon Christensen — drums

References

ECM Records albums
Bobo Stenson albums
2000 albums
Albums produced by Manfred Eicher